This is a list of Ministers of Foreign Affairs of Azerbaijan, from the Democratic Republic of Azerbaijan to the Republic of Azerbaijan.

Foreign Ministers of the Democratic Republic of Azerbaijan 
 Mammedhasan Hajinski (May 28, 1918 – October 6, 1918)
 Alimardan Topchubashev (October 6, 1918 – December 7, 1918)
 Fatali Khan Khoyski (December 26, 1918 – March 14, 1919)
 Mammad Yusif Jafarov (March 14, 1919 – December 22, 1919)
 Fatali Khan Khoyski, second term (December 24, 1919 – April 1,  1920)

Foreign Ministers of the Azerbaijan Soviet Socialist Republic 
 Nariman Narimanov (April, 1920 – May 2,  1921)
 Mirza Davud Huseynov (May 1921 – December, 1921)
 No Ministers of Foreign Affairs between 1921-1944
 Mahmud Aliyev (1944 – 1958)
 Tahira Tahirova (1959 – 1983)
 Elmira Qafarova (December 1, 1983 – December 22, 1987)
 Huseynaga Sadigov (January 23, 1988 – October 18, 1991)

Foreign Ministers of Azerbaijan Republic 

 Huseynaga Sadigov (January 23, 1988 – May 29, 1992)
 Tofig Gasimov (July 4, 1992 – June 26, 1993)
 Hasan Hasanov (September 2, 1993 – February 16, 1998)
 Tofig Zulfugarov (March 5, 1998 – October 26, 1999)
 Vilayat Guliyev (October 26, 1999 – April 7, 2004)
 Elmar Mammadyarov (April 7, 2004 – July, 16 2020)
 Jeyhun Bayramov (July, 16 2020 –)

See also 
 Ministry of Foreign Affairs of Azerbaijan

External links 
 List of the Foreign Ministers of Azerbaijan with short bio and photos 

Foreign Affairs
Government of Azerbaijan
 
1918 establishments in Azerbaijan
Foreign 
Foreign Ministers of Azerbaijan